Roy Lewis (6 November 1913 – 9 October 1996) was an English writer and small press printer.

Life and work
Although born in Felixstowe, Lewis was brought up in Birmingham and educated at King Edward's School. After studying at University College, Oxford, earning his BA in 1934, he went on to study at the London School of Economics. He began his career as an economist, but after serving as an editor on the journal, Statist, he became interested in journalism. He took a sabbatical in 1938 to travel to Australia and India. He married Christine Tew in 1939, after returning to England. They had two daughters.

Beginning in July 1939 he collaborated with Randal Heymanson to produce a newsletter called Vital News that they distributed confidentially to British and American government policymakers and bankers until December 1941.

From 1943 to 1946, he worked for the Peking Syndicate, a firm specialising in investments in China, but left to work as a journalist for the weekly, Scope. Hired by the Economist magazine, he served as its Washington, DC correspondent from 1952 to 1961. He settled full-time in England in 1961, where he became a feature writer for The Times, remaining with the newspaper until he retired in 1971. In 1957 he had set up the Keepsake Press, initially to hand print family ephemera. He soon began serious, though small-scale, production and by the time infirmity forced him to discontinue in 1990 he had brought out over a hundred titles.

The majority of the books that Lewis wrote or edited, often jointly, were nonfiction and closely related to his journalism. However, he is best known for his 1960 novel The Evolution Man, which went through six editions under a number of titles. This comic novel purports to be a first-hand account by the son of the first man to discover fire. To prevent further 'advances', the family takes matters in hand, leading to a conclusion given away by the book's eventual subtitle, 'how I ate my father'. (The 2015 film Animal Kingdom: Let's Go Ape is based on this.) Continuing authorship into old age, Lewis published a second novel in 1990, the same year that a play of his on William Shakespeare was performed in the Edinburgh Festival Fringe, followed by a novella in 1991 and a further novel in 1995. All three of these later fictions were provocative reinterpretations of Victorian times.

Legacy 
The Keepsake Poems project has been continued by another private press, Happy Dragons' Press.

Bibliography
 Shall I Emigrate? – A Practical Guide (with the assistance of Arthur Frazer, 1948)
 The English Middle Classes (with Angus Maude, UK 1949, US 1950, reprinted to 1973)
 The Visitor's Book: England and the English as Others Have Seen Them, A. D. 1500 to 1950  (edited with Harry Ballam), dedicated to: "Ahmed Ali who brought us together in his own country (India), and whose failure to record his impressions of ours is simply inexcusable", Max Parrish, London, 1950
 Professional People (with Angus Maude, 1952)
 Sierra Leone: A Modern Portrait (1954, H.M.Stationery Office, re-editions to 1957)
Colonial Development and Welfare, 1946–55 (H.M.Stationery Office, 1956)
 The Boss: The Life and Times of the British Business Man (with Rosemary Stewart, 1958); revised and enlarged edition, 1960, U.S. title, The Managers: a new examination of the English, German and American executive (1961)
 The Death of God, a Curious Narrative Dream Dreamed By Roy Lewis in the Year MCMXLIII (1943) When He Was Living in Dibrugarh in Assam and on Waking Recollected and Written Down By Him (Keepsake Press, 1959)
 What We Did to Father (1960); reprints: 1963 (as The Evolution Man, Penguin), 1968 (as Once Upon an Ice Age), 1979, 1989 (Corgi), 1993 (as The Evolution Man, or How I Ate My Father), 1994 (USA)); translated into French by Rita Barisse, Italian, Spanish, German and Czech under various titles (1990) and frequently reprinted
 The British in Africa (with Yvonne Foy, 1971) – American title: Painting Africa White: The Human Side of British Colonialism
 The Times Map of the Tribes, Peoples, and Nations of Modern Africa (compiled with Yvonne Foy, 1972)
 The Practice of Parlour Printing Considered as a Specific Against Insomnia and Like Disorders with a Warning on Side Effects Illustrated by a Retrospect of the Activities of The Keepsake Press from Its Foundation (Keepsake Press, 1975)
 Even Caxton Had His Troubles with the Pickets (1976, reprints to 1984)
 A Force for the Future: The Role of the Police in the Next Ten Years (1976)
 Enoch Powell: Principle in Politics (1979)
 Politics and Printing in Winchester, 1830–1880 (Keepsake Press, 2 editions, 1980)
 Two Conceits for Shakespearians (Keepsake Press, 1984)
 Publishing and Printing at Home (with John B. Easson, 1984)
 The Extraordinary Reign of King Ludd: An Historical Tease (1990); translated into French, Italian and Spanish under titles meaning 'The true history of the last Socialist king' (1994)
 A Walk with Mr Gladstone (1991); translated into French as Mr Gladstone et la demi-mondaine (1993)
 Cock of the Walk: A Mid-Victorian Rumpus (1995)

See also
 List of English writers
 List of 20th-century writers

Notes

English writers
Alumni of the London School of Economics
1913 births
1996 deaths
People from Felixstowe
People educated at King Edward's School, Birmingham
Alumni of University College, Oxford
English male novelists
English historical novelists
Writers of fiction set in prehistoric times
20th-century English male writers